Itheum robustum is a species of beetle in the family Cerambycidae. It was described by Oke in 1932. It is known from Australia.

References

Lamiinae
Beetles described in 1932